NGC 1403 is a lenticular or elliptical galaxy in the constellation Eridanus. It was discovered in 1886 by Francis Preserved Leavenworth. It was thought to be a "very faint, extremely small, nebulous star" by John Louis Emil Dreyer, the compiler of the New General Catalogue.

See also 
 Spiral galaxy 
 List of NGC objects (1–1000)
 Eridanus (constellation)

References

External links 
 
 SEDS

Lenticular galaxies
Eridanus (constellation)
1403
013445
Discoveries by Francis Leavenworth